William Morgan (died 1690) was a cartographer in England during the 17th century.  He was the step-grandson of John Ogilby and, following Ogilby's death in 1676, carried on the cartographic publications that Ogilby had started, including "Britannia" and a large map of the City of London.

Sources
The A to Z of Restoration London, London Topographical Society Publication No. 145, 1992.

English cartographers
1690 deaths
Year of birth unknown
17th-century cartographers
17th-century English people